Transitions is the first full-colour 3D IMAX film, created for the Canada Pavilion at Expo 86, co-directed by Colin Low and Tony Ianzelo and produced by the National Film Board of Canada. It was built upon We Are Born of Stars created for Expo '85 in Tskuba, Japan, which used anaglyph 3D. The film is also notable for the first use of stereoscopic computer animation.

Production
Canadian National, the main sponsor of the Canada Pavilion, asked the NFB to produce a film about transportation in Canada, in keeping with the fair's theme “Transportation and Communications”.

The film's computer animation sequence was produced by the Centre d'animatique unit of the NFB's French animation studio, credited to Daniel Langlois, shortly before he left the NFB to found Softimage.

Projection
Transitions was projected on a  screen at the pavilion's CN IMAX Theatre, to over 1.75 million people, during a six-month run.

See also
Momentum, a 1992 NFB IMAX HD film for Seville Expo '92, by the same creative team as Transitions 
The Romance of Transportation in Canada, a 1952 NFB animated short about transportation in Canada, also directed by Colin Low

References

External links

1986 3D films
1986 documentary films
1986 films
1986 in Canada
3D short films
Canadian 3D films
Canadian National Railway
Documentary films about transport
Expo 86
Films directed by Colin Low (filmmaker)
Films directed by Tony Ianzelo
IMAX short films
National Film Board of Canada documentaries
Canadian short documentary films
Transport in Canada
World's fair films
Films scored by Eldon Rathburn
IMAX documentary films
National Film Board of Canada short films
3D documentary films
1980s English-language films
1980s Canadian films
1980s short documentary films